The 2018 United States Senate election in Texas was held on November 6, 2018, along with other elections to the United States Senate and elections to the United States House of Representatives in additional states. Incumbent Republican U.S. Senator Ted Cruz ran successfully for re-election to a second term against Democratic candidate Beto O'Rourke. The primary for all parties was held on March 6, 2018, making it the first primary of the 2018 season. As Cruz and O'Rourke both won majorities in their primaries, they did not participate in the May 22 runoff primary that was held for some nominations in Texas.

No Democrat has won a general election for statewide office in Texas since Bob Bullock was reelected as lieutenant governor in 1994, with election forecasters declaring it a safe Republican seat at the beginning of the 2018 cycle. However, O'Rourke gradually closed the gap, and leading up to the election, the race was considered unexpectedly competitive.

On Election Day, Cruz defeated O'Rourke by a margin just short of 215,000 votes, or 2.6 percent; the race was the closest U.S. Senate race in Texas since 1978.

Background

In 2012, after a stunning upset victory in the Republican primary, then-Solicitor General of Texas Ted Cruz defeated former member of the Texas House of Representatives Paul Sadler by a 16-point margin (56%–40%). Texas has not elected a Democratic senator since 1988. As conservatives began turning to the Republican Party in once strongly Democratic areas, Democratic voters became concentrated in Southern Texas (which hold majority minority counties) and large metropolitan cities, such as Houston, Austin, San Antonio, and Dallas, as well as the far western majority-minority city of El Paso, which O'Rourke represented in the U.S. House.

Since 1990, Texas has voted for Republican statewide candidates in all elections, whether it be presidential, gubernatorial, or senatorial, often by large margins. In 1998, Governor George W. Bush won re-election by 37 points over his Democratic challenger, Garry Mauro. In 2000, Governor Bush won Texas by 21 points over Vice President Al Gore. In 2004, President Bush won Texas over Senator John Kerry by 23 points, winning rural areas by landslide margins, capturing urban zones, and coming very close to winning the Latino vote (49% to Kerry's 50%). Democrat Barack Obama was defeated by margins of 12 points in 2008, against John McCain, and 16 points in 2012, against Mitt Romney, respectively. However, in 2016, Donald Trump defeated Democrat Hillary Clinton by only a 9-point margin, demonstrating a possible shift away from the Safe Republican status it had held for over a decade. This has led Democrats to begin targeting Texas as a potential future swing state. It should also be noted that Ted Cruz defeated Donald Trump in the Texas Republican primary for U.S. President in 2016.

As of June 2018, Senator Cruz held a 49%–44% approval rating among Texans in a state Donald Trump won by 9 points against Hillary Clinton in 2016. Among groups that tend to affiliate themselves more with the Democratic Party, Senator Cruz held a 29% approval rating among Hispanics, 37% among females, and 42% among college-educated voters.

Republican primary

Candidates

Nominee
 Ted Cruz, incumbent U.S. Senator and former candidate  for president in 2016

Eliminated in primary
Bruce Jacobson, television producer
 Mary Miller, CPA
 Geraldine Sam, former mayor of La Marque
 Stefano de Stefano, attorney

Failed to qualify
 Thomas Dillingham, businessman

Withdrew
 Dan McQueen, former mayor of Corpus Christi

Declined
 George P. Bush, Texas Land Commissioner (running for re-election)
 Michael McCaul, U.S. Representative
 Dan Patrick, Lieutenant Governor of Texas (running for re-election)
 Rick Perry, Secretary of Energy, former Governor of Texas and candidate for president in 2012 and 2016
 Katrina Pierson, national spokesperson for the Donald Trump's presidential campaign in 2016 and candidate for House district TX-32 in 2014

Endorsements

Polling

Results

Democratic primary

Candidates

Nominee
 Beto O'Rourke, U.S. Representative

Eliminated in primary
Sema Hernandez, activist and organizer for the Poor People's Campaign, baseball coach and small business owner
Edward Kimbrough

Declined
 Joaquin Castro, U.S. Representative
 Julian Castro, former U.S. Secretary of Housing and Urban Development and Mayor of San Antonio
 Wendy Davis, former state senator and nominee for governor in 2014

Endorsements

Polling

Results

Libertarian nomination

Candidates

Nominated
 Neal Dikeman, businessman

Independents

Candidates

Declared
 Carl Bible, nurse
 Jonathan Jenkins, tech entrepreneur
 Bob McNeil, businessman (American Citizen Party)

Declined
 Matthew Dowd, former strategist for President George W. Bush

Notes

General election

Predictions 

Notes

Debates 
Complete video of debate, September 21, 2018
Complete video of debate, October 16, 2018

Endorsements

Fundraising 
In the third quarter of 2018, O'Rourke raised $38.1 million. This amount was the largest quarterly total raised by a U.S. Senate candidate until Jaime Harrison raised $57 million in the third quarter of 2020 in the South Carolina election. Cruz and O'Rourke combined to raise a record-setting total of $126 million during the 2018 campaign.

Polling

Results 
On November 6, 2018, Ted Cruz defeated Beto O'Rourke. However, O'Rourke gave Democrats their best performance in a Texas statewide election since Ann Richards was elected governor in 1990. In addition, O'Rourke flipped several counties in Texas that Donald Trump carried in 2016, including Williamson (includes Round Rock and Georgetown), historically conservative Tarrant (includes Fort Worth and suburbs within the DFW metroplex), Jefferson (includes Beaumont and Port Arthur), Nueces (includes Corpus Christi), sparsely populated Brewster (includes Big Bend National Park), and Hays (includes San Marcos). Cruz only flipped one county that voted for Hillary Clinton in 2016, sparsely populated Kenedy (coastal region south of Corpus Christi).

By county

Counties that flipped from Republican to Democratic
 Brewster (largest municipality: Alpine)
 Fort Bend (largest municipality: Sugar Land)
 Harris (largest municipality: Houston)
 Hays (largest municipality: San Marcos)
 Nueces (largest municipality: Corpus Christi)
 Tarrant (largest municipality: Fort Worth)
 Williamson (largest municipality: Round Rock)

By congressional district
Cruz won 20 of 36 congressional districts; O'Rourke won the other 16, including three held by Republicans.

Notes

References

External links 
Candidates at Vote Smart  
Candidates at Ballotpedia  
Campaign finance at FEC  
Campaign finance at OpenSecrets

Official campaign websites
Ted Cruz (R) for Senate
Neal Dikeman (L) for Senate
Bob McNeil (Am. Citizen)
Beto O'Rourke (D) for Senate

Ted Cruz
Beto O'Rourke
United States Senate
Texas
2018